Return of the Tyrant is the second EP release by Australian heavy metal band Lord. The title track is an almost ten-minute sequel to the song "Tarranno del Mar", which appeared on the Dungeon album One Step Beyond. Despite being over an hour in length, the band marketed this release as an EP. The release also features both an orchestral and radio edit of "Return of the Tyrant", plus versions of "Of Sins and Shadows" by Symphony X and "(I Just) Died in Your Arms" by Cutting Crew. There are also acoustic versions of songs from the Lord albums Ascendence and Set in Stone and of the Dungeon songs "Against the Wind" and "Paradise". The original project was intended as two separate EPs, one featuring just the acoustic songs and another with the new track and covers, but eventually all the songs were released together.

Track listing

Personnel

 Lord Tim – vocals, guitars, keyboards
 Andrew Dowling – bass guitar, backing vocals, lead vocal track #3
 Mark Furtner – guitar, backing vocals
 Damian Costas – drums, backing vocals

with

 Tim Yatras and Mav Stevens – backing vocals
 Gabrielle de Giorgio – keyboard (track #2)
 Byron Farrugia – voice acting (track #1)

References

Lord (band) albums
2010 EPs